The Great Hypostyle Hall is located within the Karnak temple complex, in the Precinct of Amon-Re. It is one of the most visited monuments of Ancient Egypt. The structure was built around the 19th Egyptian Dynasty (c. 1290–1224 BC). Its design was initially instituted by Hatshepsut, at the North-west chapel to Amun in the upper terrace of Deir el-Bahri. The name refers to hypostyle architectural pattern.

Architecture and construction 

The 134 papyrus columns represent the primeval papyrus swamp from which Atum, a self-created deity, arose from the waters of Nun at the beginning of creation.

The hall was not constructed by Horemheb, or Amenhotep III as earlier scholars had thought but was built entirely by Seti I who engraved the northern wing of the hall with inscriptions.  Decoration of the southern wing was completed by the 19th dynasty pharaoh Ramesses II.

Inscriptions and reliefs 

A series of succeeding pharaohs added inscriptions to the walls and the columns in places their predecessors had left blank, including Ramesses III, Ramesses IV and Ramesses VI. The northern side of the hall is decorated in raised relief, and was mainly Seti I's work. The southern side of the hall was completed by Ramesses II, in sunk relief although he used raised relief at the very beginning of his reign before changing to the sunk relief style and re-editing his own raised reliefs. Ramesses II also usurped decoration of his father along the main north-south and east-west processional ways of the hall, giving the casual observer the idea that he was responsible for the building. However, most of Seti I's reliefs in the northern part of the hall were respected.

The outer walls depict scenes of battle, Seti I on the north and Ramesses II on the south. Although these reliefs had religious and ideological functions, they are important records of the wars of these kings.  On another wall adjoining the south wall of the Hall is a record of Ramesses II's Egyptian–Hittite peace treaty that he signed in Year 21 of his reign.

In 1899, eleven of the massive columns of the Great Hypostyle Hall collapsed in a chain reaction, because their foundations were undermined by ground water. Georges Legrain, who was then the chief archaeologist in the area, supervised the rebuilding that was completed in May 1902. Later, similar work had to continue in order to strengthen the rest of the columns of the Temple.

See also
Talatat

Notes

References
Peter J. Brand, Rosa Erika Feleg, and William J. Murnane, The Great Hypostyle Hall in the Temple of Amun at Karnak, Oriental Institute Publications 142, Chicago: The Oriental Institute, 2019,   Translation and Commentary , Figures and Plates

External links
University of Memphis' Great Hypostyle Hall Project

Buildings and structures completed in the 13th century BC
Karnak temple complex
Seti I